Rimavská Baňa is a village and municipality in the Rimavská Sobota District of the Banská Bystrica Region of southern Slovakia. The name of the village means Mine of the Rimava region and is a commemoration of the mining history of the region. Although mining is for some centuries not present, the village is a home to one of the nicest decorated church in the region. Protestant church from the 13th century was several times rebuilt, in its present form it has baroque features. It contains Gothic wall paintings, painted wooden matroneum from 1726 and painted wooden ceiling.

The village is a birthplace of Juraj Palkovič, Slovak politician, professor and teacher od Ľudovít Štúr.

References

External links
 
 
http://portal.statistics.sk/files/obce-pohl-vek.pdf 
Rimavská Baňa at e-obce.sk
Information about evangelical church

Villages and municipalities in Rimavská Sobota District